Nathan Tjoe-A-On (born 22 December 2001) is a Dutch professional footballer who plays as a left-back for Eredivisie club Excelsior.

Career
Tjoe-A-On was signed to a three-year contract with Excelsior in 2019, after developing through their youth system. However, injuries stunted his development and he lost around 14 months of playing and training time. After the 2021–22 winter break he returned to action and gained confidence in his ability and felt able to do himself justice on the football field again. Following their promotion from the Eerste Divisie at the end of the 2021–22 season he received a contract extension in June 2022, for an additional two years. He made his Eredivisie debut for Excelsior on 12 August 2022 against SC Cambuur at Cambuur Stadion in a 2–0 victory. On 9 September, 2022 he scored his first professional league goal, helping Excelsior to a 2-1 win over FC Emmen.

Honours
Individual
 Eredivisie Talent of the Month: September 2022

References

External links
 

Living people
2001 births
Excelsior Rotterdam players
Dutch footballers
Eredivisie players
Eerste Divisie players
Footballers from Rotterdam
Hakka sportspeople
Sportspeople of Chinese descent
Association football defenders
Dutch sportspeople of Surinamese descent